Western Health is the governing body for healthcare regulation in an area of the Canadian province of Newfoundland and Labrador. The area region includes the communities of:
 Corner Brook
 Port Saunders
 Stephenville
 Channel-Port aux Basques
 Burgeo

In the 2022 provincial budget, the Newfoundland and Labrador Government announced its intentions to integrate the existing four health authorities into one entity. Legislation was passed in the House of Assembly approving the amalgamation in November 2022.

References 

Western